WKOZ-FM (98.3 FM) is an American radio station broadcasting an oldies format. Licensed to Carthage, Mississippi, United States.  The station is currently owned by Johnny Boswell Radio LLC.

References

External links

KOZ
Leake County, Mississippi